The Moth Eaten Howdah of the Tusker is a novel written by Indira Goswami in Kamrupi dialect. Book deals with different social issues of mid twentieth century Kamrup. Published as Dontal Hatir Une Khowa Howdah in 1986, it was translated into English by the author in 2004.

Plot
Set in Palashbari in Kamrup, it revolves around lead protagonist Giribaala and the society around her. As a widow from an Assamese Brahmin family, she narrates her experiences between two worlds: traditionalism and liberalism. The novel explores a powerful picture of change and transition.

Awards
In the year 2000, the Bharatiya Jnanpith conferred Jnanpith Award for this piece of work, among others.

Adaptations
Work is adapted in numerous television serials like Ruma Ghosh's Kamrup Ki Kahani and in 1996 Assamese language film Adajya directed by Santwana Bardoloi .

See also
 Pages Stained With Blood
 The Man from Chinnamasta

References

2004 Indian novels
Assamese novels
Rupa Publications books
Kamrupi culture
Novels set in Assam
Indian novels adapted into films